Smolt may refer to:

 one of the stages in the life cycle of a juvenile salmon, when it is preparing to live in salt water 
 Smolt (Linux), a project aimed at hardware information collection